The orange-crested manakin (Heterocercus aurantiivertex) is a species of bird in the family Pipridae.  It is found in Ecuador and Peru.  Its natural habitats are subtropical or tropical swampland and subtropical or tropical dry shrubland.

References

orange-crested manakin
Birds of the Ecuadorian Amazon
Birds of the Peruvian Amazon
orange-crested manakin
orange-crested manakin
orange-crested manakin
Taxonomy articles created by Polbot